0Z (zero Z) or 0-Z may refer to:

0Z, or zero protons; see Atomic number
0z, notation for no degree of redshift
0Z, a data set in statistics where the Standard score is zero
0Z, a Compressibility factor or zero

See also
Z0 (disambiguation)